Mayi may refer to

 Mayi, a surname
 Mayi (马邑, "Horse Town"), a former Chinese town in what is now Shuozhou, Shanxi
 Mayi clan, a clan of Indian Muslims

See also
 Battle of Mayi (133 BC) between Han China and the Xiongnu
 Mayi Bas, a village in Iran
 Mbuji-Mayi, a city in the Democratic Republic of Congo
 Eacles mayi, a moth
 Taranis mayi, a sea snail
 Mayi-Mayi, another name for Mai-Mai, a community-based militia group in the Democratic Republic of the Congo
 Mayi-Kulan and Mayi-Kutuna languages of Australia
 Ma-i, an ancient Philippine state